Volodymyr Ivanovych Horilyi (born 11 October 1965) is a Soviet and Ukrainian retired football defender and a football coach.

Career
Horilyi played for a number of teams based in USSR including Tavriya Simferopol, Dynamo Kyiv, Zenit Leningrad and Dnipro Dnipropetrovsk, as well as for Israeli side Hapoel Haifa.

In 1983 and 1986 Horilyi took part in the Summer Spartakiads of the Peoples of the USSR in the team of Ukrainian SSR.

He was capped three times for Ukraine in 1995.

He managed Dnipro Dnipropetrovsk reserve team.

Personal life
His son Taras Horilyi is also a professional footballer.

References

External links
  Profile at klisf.info
  Profile at fanatukr.com
 
 

1965 births
Living people
People from Zaporizhzhia Oblast
Soviet footballers
Ukrainian footballers
Ukraine international footballers
Ukrainian expatriate footballers
Soviet Top League players
Soviet First League players
FC Zenit Saint Petersburg players
SC Tavriya Simferopol players
FC Dynamo Kyiv players
FC Dnipro players
Hapoel Haifa F.C. players
Ukrainian Premier League players
Liga Leumit players
Expatriate footballers in Israel
Ukrainian expatriate sportspeople in Israel
Ukrainian football managers
FC Dnipro-2 Dnipropetrovsk managers
FC Nyva Vinnytsia managers
Ukrainian Second League managers
Association football defenders
Sportspeople from Zaporizhzhia Oblast